The 2022 Hlinka Gretzky Cup (branded as the 2022 Hlinka Gretzky Cup presented by Ram for sponsorship reasons) is an under-18 international ice hockey tournament held in  Red Deer, Alberta, Canada from July 31, 2022 – August 6, 2022 at Peavey Mart Centrium.

Preliminary round
All times are Mountain Daylight Time (UTC-6).

Group A

Group B

Final round

Bracket

Seventh place game

Fifth place game

Semifinals

Bronze medal game

Final

Final standings

Statistics

Scoring leaders

GP = Games played; G = Goals; A = Assists; Pts = Points; +/− = Plus–minus; PIM = Penalties In MinutesSource: hlinkagretzkycup.ca

References 

Hlinka Gretzky Cup
2022
International ice hockey competitions hosted by Canada
Hlinka
Hlinka Gretzky Cup
Hlinka Gretzky Cup